Boucerosia is a genus of flowering plants belonging to the family Apocynaceae.

Its native range is Indian Subcontinent to Myanmar.

Species:

Boucerosia crenulata 
Boucerosia diffusa 
Boucerosia frerei 
Boucerosia indica 
Boucerosia pauciflora 
Boucerosia procumbens 
Boucerosia umbellata

References

Asclepiadoideae
Apocynaceae genera